The Triple Crown of Surfing is a Hawaii a specialty series of professional surfing events that have been held annually since 1983 on the North Shore of Oahu, a coastline whose winter swells can reach  in height. 

The Triple Crown was founded by former World Champion (1968) Fred Hemmings, and Randy Rarick, who produced the Triple Crown events. The Series came under Vans' ownership in 1998. 

The three venues of Haleiwa, Sunset, and Pipeline are the last three major events of the professional surfing season; the Pipe Masters being the final event of the World Surf League Championship Tour up until 2020 when it became the first event of the 2020-21 wraparound season in December 2020.

In 2020, under challenges of the global COVID-19 pandemic, the series went fully digital. Surfers had from December 21, 2020, to January 15, 2021, to upload their two best video clips from each of the three venues. The women's division returned to Pipeline. The digital Vans Triple Crown of Surfing awarded individual location titles for Haleiwa, Sunset and Pipeline, as well as overall Vans Triple Crown champion titles to the top performing man and woman across all three locations, with a total prize purse of $200,000 split equally among men and women. There was also a digital Fan Vote title, for fan favorites, for the first time.  The Pipeline event is not to be confused with the 2020 Pipeline Masters tournament that was held to start the 2020-21 wraparound season.

The events are: 
 The Hawaiian Pro at Haleiwa Ali'i Beach Park (Nov. 12 - Nov. 24)
 The World Cup of Surfing at Sunset Beach (Nov. 25 - Dec. 6)
 The Pipeline Masters at Ehukai Beach Park (in Pūpūkea, and home to the Banzai Pipeline) (Dec. 8 - Dec. 20).

In addition to individual event champions, the Vans Triple Crown of Surfing crowns an overall champion each year. This goes to the surfer who has performed best across all three competitions.

Men's & Women's Triple Crown Champions

References

External links
 

Sports competition series
Surfing in Hawaii
Surfing competitions in Hawaii
1983 establishments in Hawaii
Annual events in Hawaii
Annual sporting events in the United States